Nekrasovka may refer to:
Nekrasovka District, a district of South-Eastern Administrative Okrug of Moscow, Russia
Nekrasovka, Republic of Tatarstan, a settlement in the Republic of Tatarstan, Russia
Nekrasovka, name of several other rural localities in Russia
Nekrasovka (Moscow Metro), a station on the Moscow Metro.